Forum Marinum is maritime museum located in Turku, Finland.

History
The museum was founded in 1999 by merging of Turku maritime museum established in 1977 and Åbo Akademi University museum of maritime history established in 1936.

Lonely Planet Scandinavia describes it as "an impressive maritime museum," and notes that it is near Turku Castle.

Exhibitions
The main exhibition was renewed in 2016 and it is now called Work at Sea. Other permanent exhibitions include:
 The Five Lives of our National Treasure (The history of the Suomen Joutsen from 1902 to 2009)
 The Forum Marinum exhibition on board the Bore (History of the Bore from construction to the present day)
 At the Shipyard (History of the Finnish Shipbuilding)
 At the Engine Factory (History of the Ship Engine Manufacturing in Turku)

Museum ships
 Full-rigged ship Suomen Joutsen
 Barque Sigyn
 Bermuda ketch Daphne
 Steam tugboat Vetäjä V
 Turunmaa-class gunboat Karjala
 Minelayer Keihässalmi
 Von Fersen-class transport vessel Wilhelm Carpelan
 Nuoli-class fast gunboat Nuoli 8
 Taisto-class motor torpedo boat Tyrsky (Taisto 3)
 MS Bore, a former steam-powered cruise ship currently used as a floating hostel
 Coast patrol boat RV 214 (Rautaville)
 Police boat PMV-1391
 Pilot cutter MKL 2103

References

External links

Official website

Maritime museums in Finland
Museums in Turku